Koyaga falsa is a species of moth of the family Noctuidae first described by Arthur Gardiner Butler in 1885. It is found in China, Korea and Japan.

The length of the forewings is 11–13 mm for males and 13–15 mm for females. The forewings are dark brown sprinkled with white and rufous. The hindwings are white sprinkled with brown.

References

Moths described in 1885
Acontiinae
Moths of Japan